Artyfechinostomum is a genus of flatworms belonging to the family Echinostomatidae.

Species:
 Artyfechinostomum malayanum
 Artyfechinostomum sufrartyfex

References

Plagiorchiida genera